Shaleen Malhotra is an Indian VJ and television actor. He plays Spl. Agent Karan Shergill in the show of Ziddi Dil Maane Na of Sony Sab. He made his television debut with Star Plus' crime based action show Arjun as ACP Arjun Suryakant Rawte.

Career 
He was a contestant of the youth-based game show MTV Roadies (season 4) in 2006, and he has also hosted audition episodes of MTV Rockathon, Stunt Mania and MTV Roadies. He was also an on-air VJ for MTV. He has hosted Pyaar Tune Kya Kiya and Code RedTalaash.

Malhotra acted in Encounter, O Gujariya: Badlein Chal Duniya and9 Ishqbaaaz and appeared in episodes of Adaalat, Yeh Hai Aashiqui and Pyaar Tune Kya Kiya. In 2017, he was in the show Koi Laut Ke Aaya Hai as army officer Rajveer Malhotra, a self-righteous and ethical person.

He played the lead role of Yuvraj Chaudhary in Colors TV Show Laado – Veerpur Ki Mardani. He was last seen as Special Agent Karan Shergill in Sony SAB's Ziddi Dil Maane Na.

Personal life
Shaleen Malhotra was born and brought up in New Delhi, India. His family is Punjabi. He is trained in parkour and kickboxing. Malhotra married his best friend, Diksha Rampal, a Delhi-based accessory designer on 4 June 2014.

Filmography

Films

Television

Web series

References

External links

Living people
Indian male television actors
Indian VJs (media personalities)
Punjabi people
Male actors from New Delhi
MTV Roadies contestants
Year of birth missing (living people)